Cipriano  may refer to:

 Cipriano (given name), a masculine given name
 Cipriano (surname), a surname